Ahmad Salim or Muhammad Salim Khawaja (born 26 January 1945 in Miana Gondal, Punjab, Pakistan) is a writer, archivist and co-founder of the South Asian Resource and Research Centre, a private archive established in 2001. He currently lives in Islamabad.

Early life
Born Muhammad Salim Khawaja in the village of Miana Gondal in Gujrat District, Punjab, Pakistan, Salim was the fourth among seven brothers and sisters.

Salim's early education was in Miana Gondal, before going to Peshawar for matriculation. While studying in Peshawar, Salim made acquaintance with writers and poets; notably Farigh Bukhari, Mohsin Ahsan, Raza Hamdani, and Jauhar Meer.

After matriculating from Peshawar, Salim moved to Karachi for his intermediate education. He got admission in Urdu College. Around that time Ahmad Salim participated in a competition arranged by Afkar, a literary magazine. Participants were asked to write their thoughts on Faiz Ahmad Faiz's poetry. Ahmad Salim's poem on Faiz got first prize in the competition. At that time Faiz was the principal of Abdullah Haroon College. On Faiz's invitation Ahmad Salim joined Abdullah Haroon College. A close association grew between Faiz and Ahmad Salim, and continued till Faiz's death in 1984.

Career
After completing high school (Intermediate) Ahmad Salim joined the National Bank in 1968. Later he was transferred to Rawalpindi where he continued working for that bank through 1969. Ahmad Salim then moved to Lahore and started teaching at Shah Hussain College. During 1969–71 he was associated with National Awami Party (NAP), and was briefly put in jail in 1971 for his criticism of Pakistan Army's operation in East Pakistan (now Bangladesh).

In 1972 Zulfiqar Ali Bhutto appointed Faiz as the Chairman of National Council of Arts. On Faiz's invitation Ahmad Salim joined the council. During his association with the National Council of Arts from 1972 through 1975, Ahmad Salim operated the Folklore Research Centre and published material on Punjabi and Sindhi folklore. Ahmad Salim left the Council shortly after Faiz left that institution in 1974.

1976–77, Ahmad Salim taught at Sindh University, Jamshoro. He taught a course on Pakistani languages—the course material was developed by him. At that time Shaikh Ayaz was the Vice-Chancellor of Sindh University. Ahmad Salim enjoyed good relations with Shaikh Ayaz, as he had translated Ayaz's poetry into Punjabi. Ahmad Salim's principal work at the Sindh University was to translate Shah Hussain's poetry into Sindhi, and Bhitai's work into Punjabi, though he could not complete the latter. During his stay at the Sindh University Ahmad Salim also completed his Bachelor of Arts degree.

After Bhutto imposed martial law, Ahmad Salim moved to Karachi in late 1977. There he wrote reviews of TV programs for Daily Aman (Editor: Afzal Siddiqui). For supplemental income Ahmad Salim did a lot of translation work too, and came to popularly known as Ahmad Salim Muttarajjim (translator). In 1979 he got admission in MA Philosophy at Karachi University. He completed MA with a gold medal. It was around that time that Ahmad Salim got married. Starting from 1981 he edited JafaKash, a labour magazine. 1985–88, Ahmad Salim taught a course on Pakistani languages at Karachi University — the same course that he had taught at Sindh University. After separating from his wife in 1988 Ahmad Salim moved to Lahore. He has one daughter from that marriage.

When Pakistan's National and Provincial assemblies were dissolved by President Ghulam Ishaque Khan in 1990, Jang group asked Ahmad Salim to write a book on Pakistan's history related to dissolution of assemblies. Ahmad Salim quickly learned the scarcity of research material and the difficulty in obtaining information from government institutes. He started collecting and archiving material of historical importance. Thus became his career in archiving.

1996– June 2007, Ahmad Salim worked as the Director of Urdu Publications for Sustainable Development Policy Institute, an NGO. He still does part-time research work for that organisation. In 2010 he received Islamic Republic of Pakistan's Pride of Performance Award in recognition of his contribution in the field of literature.

South Asian Research and Resource Centre
In 2001, Salim and his Christian friends, Leonard D'souza and Nosheen D'souza (https://web.archive.org/web/20111009143044/http://www.thecypresstimes.com/article/Christian_News/Christian_News_International/A_PAKISTANI_COUPLE_AND_THEIR_SONS_HAVE_FACED_DEATH_THREATS_AFTER_COPRODUCING_DRAMATIC_DOCUMENTARY_CALLED_BURNING_ALIVE_THE_FATE_OF_PAKISTANI_CHRISTIANS/31711), formed the South Asian Research and Resource Center (SARRC). SARRC is a private, non-profit archive, focusing on development and peace with special emphasis on the rights of religious minorities and indigenous people. It has pioneered resource and documentation services in the Pakistani non-profit sector.

Research Studies Conducted since 2003 include:
Bonded Labour in Pakistan 's Mines Sector – 2002, for the International Labour Organisation. Islamabad/Geneva
Messing Up the Past: Text Books of Pakistan 1947–2000, conducted for Ford Foundation, 2003
Studies on Curricula and textbooks reforms – Development Department, Embassy of Netherlands, 2002–2003 (with co-authorship Dr. A.H Nayyar)
Critical Issues in Education Policy – A Citizens' Review of the National Education Policy 1998–2010, Commonwealth Education/Save the Children – UK, Islamabad, 2006 (with co-authorship Dr. A.H. Nayyar)
Violence against Women for Ministry of Women Development, Govt. of Pakistan, 2004
Violence, memories and Peace building for Christian Socialists in Sweden/SIDA/Olof Palme International Centre, Sweden, 2005
Tolerance, a pilot project, University of Uppsala, Sweden, 2006
Equal Citizens? Friedrich Neumann Foundation, FNS, Islamabad 2006
Role of Minorities in Nation Building with Focus on Karachi, Church World Service Pakistan/Afghanistan, Karachi 2006
Pluralism and Diversity in Asia : Protecting and Promoting the rights of religious minorities through education and training, minority rights Group International, UK 2007
Common spiritual Heritage for Peace and Harmony, Heinrich Boll foundation, Pakistan/Afghanistan, (German Organization), Lahore 2008
Religious Fundamentalism and its Impact on non-Muslim, Christian Study Centre, funded by Church of Sweden, 2008
The Issues of Joint and Separate Electorates Systems, Christian Study Centre, funded by Church of Sweden, 2008
Sufism and Peace, Church world Service, Pakistan / Afghanistan, Karachi 2008
State Accountability and Education rights of Minorities in Pakistan (A pre-roundtable background paper), 2008, IDRC, Canada
Textbooks for Religious Studies (Ethics) Grade III to Grade XII for National Book Foundation, Ministry of Education, Government of *Pakistan are being prepared for 2009–2010, education sessions.
Textbooks on parliamentary Democracy (Grade V, VIII and X) for SDPD (United Nations Development Programme)
Development of 10 textbook modules for non-Muslims students in Pakistani schools. These proposed texts have been developed as alternative educational materials with the support of Minority Rights Group, UK

SARRC contains a wealth of information on minorities, development, gender, security and violence which have been focal to the evolution of history and society of the region. The SARRC has acquired and preserved information including fact-sheets, unpublished material, manuscripts, policy papers and official reports of various Commissions and Committees. Almost all of the important newspapers, periodicals, books, reports and documents published during the last two centuries are preserved under one roof.

Bibliography
Salim has written several books on Pakistani history.

References

1945 births
Pakistani male journalists
Living people
Pakistani archivists
Academic staff of the University of Sindh
Pakistani translators
People from Gujrat District
Academic staff of the University of Karachi